Socialist Revolutionary Party, also known as Social-Revolutionaries was a Persian revolutionary socialist party based in Baku, Caucasus. It was one of the most important parties established by the Persian emigrants in Transcaucasia during Qajar dynasty. The party published an Azerbaijani language newspaper twice a week, named Ekinçi ve Fe'le and edited by Hosayn Israfilbekov.

References

Defunct socialist parties in Iran
Political parties with year of disestablishment missing
Political parties with year of establishment missing
Political parties in Qajar Iran